State Highway 63 (SH 63) is a  long state highway in northeastern Colorado. SH 63's southern terminus is at U.S. Route 36 (US 36) in Anton, and the northern terminus is at US 6 in Atwood.

Route description
SH 63 begins in the south at a junction with U.S. Highway 36 at Anton and proceeds north through remote, sparsely populated land for roughly  before reaching a junction with U.S. Highway 34 at Akron.  From there, the route continues north for a further  to cross Interstate 76 at that highway's exit 115 and after roughly four more miles arrives at its northern terminus at U.S. Highway 6 in Atwood.

History
SH 63 was defined in the 1920s by the Colorado Department of Transportation, when it connected State Highway 96 in Haswell to Atwood at U.S. Highway 6. A gap appeared near Haswell in 1946. The section was later deleted by 1954, leaving its current routing from Anton to Atwood. This section was paved by 1961.

Major intersections

References

External links

063
Transportation in Washington County, Colorado
Transportation in Logan County, Colorado